The Milwaukee Marathon is an annual marathon, and a Boston Marathon qualifying race, for runners of all ages and abilities that courses through downtown Milwaukee each spring. It offers three race distances: a full marathon (26.2 miles), a half marathon (13.1 miles), and a 5k (3.1 miles).

The inaugural event, branded the PNC Milwaukee Running Festival, was held on November 1st, 2015 and saw great success, attracting 3,700 participants. However, the course was mismeasured two years in a row in 2016 and 2017, with 2016’s being too long and 2017’s too short. The resulting backlash from runners and city officials threw the future of the race into question.

Seeing the potential to turn the Milwaukee Marathon into a world-class event, Rugged Races, a Boston-based race production company with marathon experience that organizes 90 races annually, bought the Milwaukee Marathon in August 2018 and immediately started to overhaul the event.

Race Cancellations and Uncertain Future
In 2020, several marathons were cancelled or postponed due to the COVID-19 pandemic. A month before the start of the Milwaukee Marathon, Gov. Tony Evers declared a State of Emergency. A few days later, as the cases of COVID-19 climbed in the state, he ordered all citizens to stay at home until April 28. 

With the state restricting public gatherings, Milwaukee Marathon race organizers announced March 27 that the fifth annual running would be canceled, along will all other races taking place during the April 10–11 weekend. Despite the cancellation, race organizers refused to offer refunds - instead promising a 20% off code that could be used for the following year’s race. 

Rugged Races was acquired by Ventures Endurance Events LLC and rebranded as Ventures Endurance on June 17, 2021. The company said they were working with the city of Milwaukee on a date and route for the race in fall 2021, and suggested the race would be run in October. But by mid-September 2021, they had yet to communicate a date for the race.

Results

2021

Race postponed, no date announced.

2020

Races canceled due to COVID-19 pandemic

2019

2018

2017

2016

1 Mile

5K

Half Marathon

Marathon

2015

1 Mile

5K

Half Marathon

Marathon

References

External links

Marathons in the United States
2015 establishments in Wisconsin
Recurring sporting events established in 2015